Kačar (Serbian Cyrillic: Качар) is an occupational Serbian surname meaning cooper. It may refer to:
Ervin Kačar (born 1991), Serbian football player
Gojko Kačar (born 1987), Serbian football player
Slobodan Kačar (born 1957), Yugoslav boxer, brother of Tadija
Svetozar Kačar, Yugoslav war hero, eponym of Kačarevo
Tadija Kačar (born 1956), Yugoslav boxer, brother of Slobodan, father of Gojko

See also
Kaçar, a Turkish surname

Serbian surnames
Occupational surnames